Isabel Drescher (born 9 March 1994) is a German former competitive figure skater. She is the 2007–08 German national silver medalist and competed at three World Junior Championships. Her best result was 10th in 2009.

Drescher took her first skating lessons at the age of 5 in a public skating session in Unna, Germany and afterwards went to the club training sessions that took place twice a week. At age 7 she passed the necessary test to become part of the North Rhine-Westphalian skating team and started taking lessons at the regional training centre in Dortmund where she trained until September 2009. She moved to Berlin and switched coach to Viola Striegler after many problems with her former coach Martina Dieck in September 2009, only one week after the Junior Grand Prix in Poland. In autumn 2010, Drescher returned to Dortmund and resumed training with Martina Dieck. Drescher represents the TSCE Dortmund.

Programs

Competitive highlights 
JGP: Junior Grand Prix

References

External links

 
 Official site
 Isabel Drescher at Tracings.net

1994 births
Living people
German female single skaters
Sportspeople from Dortmund
20th-century German women
21st-century German women